The Cape Town Agreement is an international IMO legal instrument that sets out minimum safety requirements for fishing vessels of 24 metres in length and over or equivalent in gross tons. The Cape Town Agreement was established in 2012 but has not entered in force.

The treaty will enter info force when at least 22 states, with over 3,600 fishing vessels of 24m in length sign the treaty. As of November 2022, there are 17 contracting States to the agreement. These are Belgium, Congo, Cook Islands, Croatia, Denmark, Finland, France, Germany, Iceland, Kenya, The Netherlands, Norway, Peru, Saint Kitts and Nevis, Sao Tome and Principe, South Africa and Spain. The 17 member States represent approximately 1,925 eligible fishing vessels.

Content
The Cape Town Agreement defines minimum requirements on the design, construction and equipment of fishing vessels. It also includes details for the inspection of fishing vessels, as well as mandatory requirements for ship stability, seaworthiness, life-saving appliances, fire safety, ventilation and communication equipment. The regulations are designed to protect the safety of fishing vessel crews and to establish a common standard for the industry. The Agreement is designed to reduce the high number of deaths in the international fishing industry.

The Cape Town Agreement will updated, amend and replace the Torremolinos Protocol of 1993 and the Torremolinos International Convention for the Safety of Fishing Vessels of 1977.

The Agreement allows a flag State to exempt any fishing vessels flying its flag from compliance, provided that a certain set of minimum criteria are applicable.

References

Maritime safety
Treaties concluded in 2012
International Maritime Organization treaties